The 2017–18 season of the Liga Portuguesa de Futsal was the 28th season of top-tier futsal in Portugal. It was named Liga Sport Zone for sponsorship reasons. The regular season started on September 9, 2017, and ended on May 5, 2018. After the end of the regular season, the top eight teams played the championship playoffs.

Sporting CP won the competition for the third time in a row, matching the two best runs in the history of the competition.

Teams

League table

Title Playoffs

Extra Time = *

Penalty shootout = **

See also
Futsal in Portugal

References

Futsal
Portuguese Futsal First Division seasons
Portugal